Kertus Davis (born February 26, 1981) is a NASCAR driver. He is currently the competition director for JD Motorsports.

Prior to NASCAR/USAR 
Davis began racing in go-karts at the age of eight, competing in his hometown of Gaffney around various tracks. He raced in the karts for a number of years, and finished 3rd in the World Karting Association finals at the age of 17. In 1998, Davis began racing Late Model Stock Cars in various Southeastern tracks, gaining experience and a handful of top-five finishes. He mostly competed at Myrtle Beach Speedway, Greenville-Pickens Speedway, and Timmonsville Speedway. During the 1999 season, he made three starts in the USAR ProCup Series.

He competed for Rookie of the Year in 2000 in the USAR Pro-Cup Competing in 20 events, Davis finished the season 17th in points with top ten finishes. In 2001, he finished 11th in the Southern Division points standing with eight top-ten finishes. After a part-time USAR run in 2002, he joined Premiere Motorsports to run a full-time schedule 2003. He won his first race at Smithton, Pennsylvania and finished third in the Northern Division points, thirteenth for the entire sanctioning body.

Early NASCAR career 
Davis made his NASCAR debut in 2001 at Nazareth Speedway for Jimmy Means. He qualified the No. 52 Broadway Motors Ford Taurus in 34th place, but finished 36th after an early engine failure. In the next two races, he finished 42nd at Dover International Speedway and 40th at the Milwaukee Mile. He made the switch over to the No. 77 Gestener Ford for Moy Racing at the second Dover race, where he finished 34th after a crash.

Davis made five starts in 2002. He ran the No. 77 Docutech/Gestetner Ford in his first 2002 race at Richmond, and had the best weekend of his career at the time with a 29th place start and 26th-place finish. For the rest of the season, Davis only drove the No. 0 Chevrolet for his father's race team, Davis Motorsports. In four starts, his best finish was a 24th at Memphis Motorsports Park. Davis did not race at all in 2003, due to his USAR commitments,  but he played a large role as Davis Motorsports began to run full-time in the series. He worked in the shop and every now and then on the pit box, as the team made its first full season.

He raced again in 2004, starting at Indianapolis Raceway Park for his father's team, where he had a 29th-place finish, followed by a 27th at Dover and a 34th at Darlington. Davis moved to the No. 0 full-time in 2005, with RaceGirl serving as sponsor. He failed to qualify for five races, but had a career-best tenth-place run at Talladega Superspeedway, and finished thirty-first in points. He also made one start in the No. 12 Supercuts/Hot Tamales Dodge at Texas Motor Speedway for FitzBradshaw Racing, but finished in 40th due to a transmission failure.  For the 2006 season, Davis attempted to race full-time. The team used former Busch Series champion Randy LaJoie to get in the race at Mexico, and at Atlanta, MacDonald Motorsports aided the Davis team with MacDonald's pit crew. Davis also took one-race deals, driving the No. 34 Sport Clips Chevrolet for Frank Cicci Racing at Darlington, the No. 43 Ollie's Bargain Outlet Dodge for the Curb Agajanian Performance Group at Dover, and at Nashville, he prepared the No. 20 Rockwell Automation car for NEXTEL Cup driver Denny Hamlin. He returned to his own car at Milwaukee, where he finished out the season. He also attempted races for Morgan Shepherd, CJM Racing, and Front Row Motorsports at the Nextel Cup level, but did not qualify for any of those races.

2007–present 

In 2007, Davis signed to drive for Kevin Harvick Incorporated in the No. 77 Dollar General Chevy for 13 races, sharing the car with Bobby Labonte and Kevin Harvick. Davis ran at Fontana starting 33rd but collided with Eric McClure who ironically was driving the No. 0 car that Davis drove before. He recovered to finish 30th, last on lead lap. He then made his first road course start at Mexico where he started 37th and finished 31st one lap down. He was replaced by Ron Hornaday Jr. prior to the race at Milwaukee. Shortly after that, it was announced that Davis had been released by KHI, due to Dollar General wanting only Cup drivers in the car. He ran the rest of the season in the No. 01 car fielded by his family team.

For 2008, Davis began the season in the No. 0 car, but moved over to the No. 01 after one race with RaceGirl sponsoring. This came after his team in the opening race of 2008 was penalized due to an illegal oil tank. The team was penalized 25 driver & owner points, and crew chief Gene Allnut was suspended for 6 races. In the interim, Davis had the 1st ever female crew chief in NASCAR's top touring series at Las Vegas. Kertus at Talladega in 2008 avoided the "Big One" again like in 2005 and he finished 12th on the lead lap falling out of the top 10 in turn 4. Following the race at Nashville where he blew his engine, Davis left his father's team to pursue other racing options. He was 24th in points at the time. He spent the rest of the season driving the No. 49 for Jay Robinson. In 2009, Davis returned to Jay Robinson Racing in the No. 49 car. GetMoreVacations.com sponsored the car for a few races in the beginning of the season. After 14 races in 2009 with JRR, Davis went back to his father's team to drive the No. 04 Chevy. He did not race in 2010, but served as crew chief for the No. 0 JD Motorsports Chevrolet driven by Chrissy Wallace in the Aaron's 312 at Talladega;. in 2011 he became the team's competition director.

Motorsports career results

NASCAR
(key) (Bold – Pole position awarded by qualifying time. Italics – Pole position earned by points standings or practice time. * – Most laps led.)

Nextel Cup Series

Nationwide Series

ARCA Re/Max Series
(key) (Bold – Pole position awarded by qualifying time. Italics – Pole position earned by points standings or practice time. * – Most laps led.)

References

External links 

1981 births
Living people
NASCAR drivers
ARCA Menards Series drivers
CARS Tour drivers
People from Gaffney, South Carolina
Racing drivers from South Carolina